Washington Township is the name of forty-six townships in Indiana:

 Washington Township, Adams County, Indiana
 Washington Township, Allen County, Indiana
 Washington Township, Blackford County, Indiana
 Washington Township, Boone County, Indiana
 Washington Township, Brown County, Indiana
 Washington Township, Carroll County, Indiana
 Washington Township, Cass County, Indiana
 Washington Township, Clark County, Indiana
 Washington Township, Clay County, Indiana
 Washington Township, Clinton County, Indiana
 Washington Township, Daviess County, Indiana
 Washington Township, Dearborn County, Indiana
 Washington Township, Decatur County, Indiana
 Washington Township, Delaware County, Indiana
 Washington Township, Elkhart County, Indiana
 Washington Township, Gibson County, Indiana
 Washington Township, Grant County, Indiana
 Washington Township, Greene County, Indiana
 Washington Township, Hamilton County, Indiana
 Washington Township, Harrison County, Indiana
 Washington Township, Hendricks County, Indiana
 Washington Township, Jackson County, Indiana
 Washington Township, Knox County, Indiana
 Washington Township, Kosciusko County, Indiana
 Washington Township, LaPorte County, Indiana
 Washington Township, Marion County, Indiana
 Washington Township, Miami County, Indiana
 Washington Township, Monroe County, Indiana
 Washington Township, Morgan County, Indiana
 Washington Township, Newton County, Indiana
 Washington Township, Noble County, Indiana
 Washington Township, Owen County, Indiana
 Washington Township, Parke County, Indiana
 Washington Township, Pike County, Indiana
 Washington Township, Porter County, Indiana
 Washington Township, Putnam County, Indiana
 Washington Township, Randolph County, Indiana
 Washington Township, Ripley County, Indiana
 Washington Township, Rush County, Indiana
 Washington Township, Shelby County, Indiana
 Washington Township, Starke County, Indiana
 Washington Township, Tippecanoe County, Indiana
 Washington Township, Warren County, Indiana
 Washington Township, Washington County, Indiana
 Washington Township, Wayne County, Indiana
 Washington Township, Whitley County, Indiana

See also

Washington Township (disambiguation)

Indiana township disambiguation pages